Nadia Stacey is a British make-up artist. She was nominated for an Academy Award in the category Best Makeup and Hairstyling for the film Cruella.

Selected filmography 
 Cruella (2021; co-nominated with Naomi Donne and Julia Vernon)

References

External links 

Living people
Year of birth missing (living people)
Place of birth missing (living people)
British make-up artists
Best Makeup BAFTA Award winners